is the fifth studio album by Japanese singer/songwriter Mari Hamada, released on December 21, 1985 by Invitation. It is Hamada's first album to generate a single. Like the previous release Rainbow Dream, Blue Revolution includes two English-language cover songs. The album was reissued alongside Hamada's past releases on January 15, 2014.

Track listing

Personnel 
 Tak Matsumoto – guitar
 Tomonori Yamada – bass
 Yoshihiro Naruse – bass
 Yōgo Kōno – keyboards
 Rei Atsumi – keyboards
 Tsutomu Ōhira – keyboards
 Atsuo Okamoto – drums

Footnotes

References

External links 
  (Mari Hamada)
  (Victor Entertainment)
 
 

1985 albums
Japanese-language albums
Mari Hamada albums
Victor Entertainment albums